"Botch-a-Me" is a popular song, written in 1940. The original Italian version ("Ba-Ba-Baciami Piccina") by Alberto Rabagliati was written by Riccardo Morbelli (words) and Luigi Astore (music). English lyrics were written by Eddie Stanley. Baciami in Italian means "kiss me".

The song was popularized by Rosemary Clooney in 1952. The recording was released by Columbia Records as catalog number 39767. The record first reached the Billboard magazine charts on June 20, 1952 and lasted 17 weeks on the chart, peaking at number two.

References

1940 songs
1952 singles
Rosemary Clooney songs